The FIS Snowboarding World Championships 2009 took place between January 17 and January 24 in Hyundai Sungwoo Resort close to Duwon-ri in Hoengseong County in Gangwon, South Korea.

Results

Men's results

Snowboard Cross
Qualification runs began on January 17 with the finals taking place on January 18.

Parallel Giant Slalom
Parallel Giant Slalom finals took place on January 20.

Parallel Slalom
The Parallel Slalom finals took place on January 21.

Halfpipe
The finals took place on January 23.

Big Air
Big Air finals took place on January 24.

Women's Events

Snowboard Cross

Qualification runs began on January 17 with the finals taking place on January 18.

Parallel Giant Slalom
Parallel Giant Slalom finals took place on January 20.

Parallel Slalom
The Parallel Slalom finals took place on January 21.

Halfpipe
The finals took place on January 23.

Medal table

References

External links
 venue at Google Maps: Sungwoo Resort
 FIS 2009 World Championships Results Page

2009
2009 in South Korean sport
January 2009 sports events in South Korea